The Inkwell, also known as The Octagon House, is an historic octagonal house located at 30868 US 264 in Engelhard, Hyde County, North Carolina on Lake Mattamuskeet. It was built about 1857 by Dr. William T. Sparrow.  The house is an eight-sided, two-story, frame dwelling, sitting on a brick pier foundation. Its boardwall construction and use of verticals only around the doors and windows follows Howland's cottage design in Orson S. Fowler's 1848 book entitled The Octagon House, a Home for All. A restoration of the Octagon House in the 1980s returned its appearance to its earlier conception using plaster interior walls, a stuccoed exterior and a wood shingle roof. The house features a central octagonal chimney of stuccoed brick.

On September 1, 1978, it was added to the National Register of Historic Places.  It is located in the Lake Landing Historic District.

A Mattamuskeet apple orchard has been planted on the grounds of The Octagon House. Trees were grafted from the wood of surviving fruit trees that were featured in nursery catalogues of the area during the mid-19th century.

Several Open Houses are held throughout the year and special group tours may be arranged by appointment.

References

Houses on the National Register of Historic Places in North Carolina
Houses completed in 1855
Houses in Hyde County, North Carolina
Octagon houses in the United States
National Register of Historic Places in Hyde County, North Carolina
Individually listed contributing properties to historic districts on the National Register in North Carolina